Kuchaikote Assembly constituency is an assembly constituency in Gopalganj district in the Indian state of Bihar.

Overview
As per Delimitation of Parliamentary and Assembly constituencies Order, 2008, No. 102 Kuchaikote Assembly constituency is composed of the following: Kuchaikote and Pachdeuri community development blocks.

Kuchaikote Assembly constituency is part of No. 17 Gopalganj (Lok Sabha constituency) (SC).

Members of Legislative Assembly

Election results

2020

References

External links
 

Assembly constituencies of Bihar
Politics of Gopalganj district, India